Ranald MacDonald (1824–1894) was the first native English-speaker to teach the English language in Japan.

Ranald MacDonald may also refer to:
Ranald MacDonald (bishop) (1756–1832), Scottish Roman Catholic bishop
Ranald MacDonald (founder of Clanranald), Scottish, founder of the MacDonald of Clanranald
Ranald Og MacDonald, captured Dunyvaig Castle in 1614
Ranald Macdonald (1928–1999), Scottish rugby player
Ranald Macdonald (journalist) (born 1938), Australian journalist, media executive, broadcaster and educator
Ranald George Macdonald (1788–1873), Scottish clan chief and Member of Parliament
Ranald Roderick Macdonald (1945–2007), British mathematician and psychologist

See also
Ronald McDonald (disambiguation)